The QF 4-inch gun Mks I, II, III were early British QF (quick-firing) naval guns originating in 1895. They all had barrels of 40 calibres length.

Naval service
The gun was intended to be a more powerful alternative to the quick-firing 3-inch QF 12-pounder gun, and a faster-firing replacement for the BL 4-inch gun.

It was mounted on the following ships :
  third-class protected cruisers of 1896
 s of 1898
 s of 1900
  third-class cruisers, launched in 1903
 s of 1906

Its  shell proved insufficiently powerful to make it much of an improvement on the 12-pounder. From 1907 onwards it was succeeded in its class on new warships by the BL 4 inch gun Mk VIII, which fired a  shell.

Coast Defence gun
From 1906 a number of Mk III guns were transferred from the Royal Navy for use as coast defence guns around the United Kingdom, and remained until 1939.

In 1918 three guns were in service at Dover Garrison and eight at Forth Garrison.

World War I land service
Her 8 QF 4-inch Mk III guns were recovered and used ashore in the East African campaign. Some were used as coast defence guns at Zanzibar and Mombasa. Two guns, and from 11 February 1916, three guns, were used by 10th Heavy Battery manned by the Royal Marines, mounted on improvised field carriages and towed by Packard lorries, supported by six REO lorries carrying ammunition.

Surviving guns

 A gun was installed in 1918 on the island of Hirta in the St Kilda archipelago, northwest Scotland, after a German submarine attack there, by the German submarine SM U-90.

See also
 List of naval guns

Notes

References

Bibliography
 Text Book of Gunnery, 1902. LONDON : PRINTED FOR HIS MAJESTY'S STATIONERY OFFICE, BY HARRISON AND SONS, ST. MARTIN'S LANE 
 General Sir Martin Farndale, History of the Royal Regiment of Artillery : Forgotten Fronts and the Home Base 1914-18. London:The Royal Artillery Institution, 1988

External links

 Drill for 4 -inch Q.F. gun (land service). 1914 at State Library of Victoria
 Gun drill for 4 inch Q.F. mark III gun (land service) 1924 at State Library of Victoria
 Tony DiGiulian, British 4"/40 (10.2 cm) QF Marks I, II and III
 Diagram of gun on garrison carriage at Victorian Forts and Artillery page

 

Naval guns of the United Kingdom
100 mm artillery
Coastal artillery
Victorian-era weapons of the United Kingdom
World War I naval weapons of the United Kingdom